Rhys Crane (born 14 October 1985 in Wolverhampton) is a former rugby union player for London Welsh, who plays at wing. He joined Bath after completing a degree in Sports and Exercise Science at Cardiff University.

Crane made quite an impression during Bath's pre-season friendly against Ulster in August 2008 by scoring three tries and he went on to save the EDF Energy Cup game against Sale Sharks in October 2008 with a last-ditch tackle in the corner that prevented the Sharks from scoring a winning try.

On 31 May 2013, Crane signed for London Welsh in the RFU Championship for 2013/14 season.

References

1985 births
Living people
Alumni of Cardiff University
Bath Rugby players
English rugby union players
Nottingham R.F.C. players
People educated at Old Swinford Hospital
Rugby union players from Wolverhampton
Rugby union wings
Sale Sharks players